John William Murphy (April 26, 1902 – March 28, 1962) was a United States representative from Pennsylvania and a United States district judge of the United States District Court for the Middle District of Pennsylvania.

Education and career

Murphy was born in Avoca, Luzerne County, Pennsylvania. His father, Edward T. Murphy, was a coal miner, and he worked as a mine slate picker after his father's death. Murphy attended the public schools, then received a Bachelor of Science degree from the Wharton School of the University of Pennsylvania in 1926. He received a Bachelor of Laws from University of Pennsylvania Law School in 1929. He was admitted to the bar in 1929 and commenced private practice of law in Scranton, Pennsylvania from 1929 to 1943. He was an assistant district attorney of Lackawanna County, Pennsylvania from 1934 to 1941. He was a United States representative from Pennsylvania from 1943 to 1946.

Congressional service

Murphy was elected as a Democrat to the 78th and 79th United States Congresses and served from January 3, 1943, until his resignation on July 17, 1946. Murphy served on the Joint House-Senate Committee to investigate the attack on Pearl Harbor in 1945. That led to a close friendship with Vice President Alben W. Barkley, who headed the Senate side of the investigation.

Federal judicial service

Murphy was nominated by President Harry S. Truman on May 7, 1946, to a seat on the United States District Court for the Middle District of Pennsylvania vacated by Judge Albert Williams Johnson. He was confirmed by the United States Senate on May 21, 1946, and received his commission on May 27, 1946. He served as Chief Judge from 1955 to 1962. He served on the Committee of Operation of the Jury System in the United States Courts of the Judicial Conference of the United States. His service was terminated on March 28, 1962, due to his death in Scranton.

Other service

Murphy was a member of the Board of Managers of the University of Pennsylvania Law School and Chairman of the Board of Advisors of Marywood College.

Interment

Murphy is interred in St. Catherine's Cemetery in Moscow, Pennsylvania.

Honor

Murphy was made a Knight of the Cross of the Equestrian Order of the Holy Sepulcher in an investiture ceremony at St. Patrick's Cathedral on September 10, 1960.

Family

Murphy married Ella Heffron and had four children.

References

Sources

The Political Graveyard

1902 births
1962 deaths
People from the Scranton–Wilkes-Barre metropolitan area
Judges of the United States District Court for the Middle District of Pennsylvania
United States district court judges appointed by Harry S. Truman
20th-century American judges
Wharton School of the University of Pennsylvania alumni
University of Pennsylvania Law School alumni
Democratic Party members of the United States House of Representatives from Pennsylvania
20th-century American lawyers
20th-century American politicians